John Bevier Ackerman (April 29, 1909 – June 13, 1981) was the second vice director of the National Security Agency of the United States and a major general of the United States Air Force.

Early life
Ackerman was born April 28, 1909, in Auburn, New York, the son of John Walter Ackerman (1867–1955) and Bertha H. Vedder Ackerman (1877–1978). He had an older brother, Lauren Ackerman, and a younger sister, Helen Ackerman Stokinger.

Through his father, Ackerman is a descendant of the New York DeWitt family, making him a distant cousin of New York State Governor DeWitt Clinton. He is also a descendant of New Paltz, New York patentees, or founders, Louis Bevier, Simon LeFevre, and Christian Deyo. His middle name comes from his paternal great-grandmother, Maria Bevier DeWitt (1811–1877). His 3rd great-grandfather, Johannes Bevier (1724–1797), was supervisor of the town of Rochester, New York in 1778.

At the time of the 1910 and 1920 United States Census recordings, the family was still living in Auburn. Around 1924, the family moved to Watertown, New York, after Ackerman's father took the Watertown city manager position. The 1930 United States Census shows the family living in Watertown.

John graduated from Watertown High School in 1926. He was a member of the New York National Guard which enabled him to gain appointment to the United States Military Academy in July 1928. He graduated 53rd out of 262 in 1932.

Military career
Ackerman entered school at Randolph Air Force Base in Texas in 1933, graduating in June 1935. He was first assigned to Kelly Field in San Antonio, Texas, and the 1940 United States Census states that was his residence in 1935. He was then assigned to Maxwell Field in Alabama. 

In 1938, he entered the California Institute of Technology in Pasadena, California, where after a year's worth of study he earned a degree of Master of Science and aeronautics of aviation meteorology. 

In 1940, Ackerman, at this point promoted to captain, served as station weather officer and assistant operations manager at Chanute Field in Illinois. The 1940 Census states him living in Rantoul, Illinois, with his wife Virginia and their son Laurens. 

Following this assignment, Captain Ackerman was sent back to the California Institute of Technology with three others for research on a project concerning long-range weather forecasts. He then helped to form the Air Corps Weather Service.

Promoted again, now Colonel Ackerman was assigned to the China-Burma-India theater during World War II to serve as a planner for General George E. Stratemeyer. 

From 1945 to 1946, Colonel Ackerman was assistant chief of staff, plans, for the Continental Air Forces. From 1950 to 1953, Colonel Ackerman was deputy director of intelligence. Following this, from 1953 to 1956, he served as vice director of the National Security Agency, during which time he was also promoted to Major General.

Towards the end of his career, from 1956 to 1958, General Ackerman became commander of the Thirteenth Air Force, stationed in the Philippines. Upon his return to the United States in 1958, General Ackerman was named deputy commander of the Air Force Security Service stationed in San Antonio, Texas, the location of one of his first military assignments. He would retire in 1960.

Death and burial
General Ackerman would pass away on June 13, 1981, in Beaufort, South Carolina. He was laid to rest in the All Saints Churchyard, located at the All Saints Church, Maidstone in Kent, England. He was 72 years of age at his death.

Personal life
Ackerman married firstly Virginia Beech Svarz on September 8, 1934, in Los Angeles County, California. They had a son, Laurens Vedder Ackerman (born 1938). 

He married secondly Anne Faith Donaldson D'Oench on December 28, 1945, in Carson City, Nevada. They had a son, Allan Douglas Ackerman (born 1947).

References

External links
List of former Vice/Deputy Directors of the NSA.

United States Air Force Academy alumni
Deputy Directors of the National Security Agency
1981 deaths
1909 births
United States Army Air Forces personnel of World War II
United States Army Air Forces officers
United States Air Force generals
People from Auburn, New York